Joseph Haydn's Symphony 'A' in B major, Hoboken I/107, was written between 1757 and 1760. It therefore must have been composed for Count Morzin's orchestra, for whom Haydn worked until 1761.

It is not in the usual numbering scheme for Haydn symphonies because it was originally thought to be a string quartet (Op. 1/5) by 19th century scholars and was catalogued as Hob. III/5.

It is scored for 2 oboes, bassoon, 2 horns in B alto, strings and continuo.

References

Symphony 107
Compositions in B-flat major